Gerald Jon 'Jerry' Hansen (Born October 23, 1936 in Minneapolis, Minnesota) is a former racing driver. Hansen has won a record of 27 SCCA National Championships. Hansen has also competed in Can-Am, the Atlantic Championship, USAC ChampCar among other series.

Racing career

Early career

Minneapolis stockbroker and real estate investor Jerry Hansen started his racing career in 1961 in an Echidna Racing Special in the SCCA C Modified class. In 1965 Hansen  traded his Echidna for a Scarab Mk.II. In his first race at Road America, Hansen had a fearsome crash. At the Carousel corner the Scarab skidded of the track and hit the guardrail. The car flipped multiple times, was on fire and knocked over a tree. Hansens injuries were minor.

Open wheel racing
Hansen made his SCCA National Championship Runoffs debut in the Formula Vee class. Racing at Riverside Raceway the driver finished fourth, behind William Duckworth, Roger Barr and winner Lewis Kerr. Stepping up to Formula 5000, Hansen was a longtime competitor in the class. In the 1968 SCCA Grand Prix Championship Hansen won the Badger 200 at Road America. Starting the race from pole position, Hansen beat his competition in the combined Formula A, Formula B and Formula C field. At the 1968 SCCA National Championship Runoffs Hansen finished second in the Formula A class, 5,5 seconds behind Ron Grable. In 1969 Hansen was on the entry list for most of the races. But technical retirements hampered strong results. For the final race at Sebring Hansen was signed by Carl Haas Racing Team. After starting the Lola T190 in eighth place,
Hansen finished fifteenth. After not racing in the national Formula 5000 series, Hansen returned in the class for 1971. After scoring a heat win, he finished the main race in second place, behind Hogan Racings David Hobbs. 

During the season he also made four appearances in the pinnacle of American autosport, the USAC National Championship. He failed to finish due to a broken valve in his debut race at his hometrack, Brainerd International Raceway. Hansen had a better run at Pacific Raceways. A double header, with two 45 lap races on the same day, Hansen finished in the top ten twice. He beat many series regulars such as Bobby Unser, Mark Donohue and Billy Vukovich. After a mediocre 1970 racing season, Hansen won several championships in 1971. In 1971 Hansen won the SCCA National Championship Runoffs in Formula A, A Sports Racer and A Production. It was the first time in Runoffs history that a driver won three classes at the Runoffs in the same year. This feat earned him the SCCA President's Cup. 

Hansen, and his crew chief Mike Lindorfer, made modifications to the Lola T192 IndyCar to run in USAC and IMCA sprint car races. In a spectaculair race at the Minnesota State Fair, Hansen won by lapping the whole field three times.

Sports car racing

Hansen raced in the original United States Road Racing Championship, sanctioned by the SCCA. After a couple of races, during 1964 and 1965, Hansen competed in most of the 1966 season. Racing a Chevrolet powered Lotus 19 proved no success. In 1965 Hansen requested Lee Dykstra and George Anderson to design and build Can-Am spec car, the Wolverine LD65. Although the plan was to build three cars, only one was built. The first race at Mid-Ohio proved fruitless with a retirement after 27 of 85 laps. During his Can-Am debut, in 1966 at Mont-Tremblant, he finished in 20th place. Hansen returned to Can-Am competition in 1967 at Road America in a McLaren M1C. In 1968 Hansen raced most of the Can-Am season in a McLaren M6A. His best result came at the Los Angeles Times Grand Prix finishing seventh. During the same year he also won the A Sports Racer class at the SCCA National Championship Runoffs in the McLaren M6A. He won the prestigious race for Can-Am spec cars in 1969, 1971, 1972 and 1975 thru 1984. Hansen also raced in the B Sports Racer class in 1973 and 1974 winning both races.

In SCCA regional competition, Hansen was very successful racing a McKee Chevette, designed and built by Bob McKee. Hasnen won races at Breezy Point, Lynndale Farms, Metropolitan Stadium and Meadlowlands.

GT racing
Hansen was also a successful GT racer. The driver won the SCCA National Championship Runoffs in the A Production class in 1972 racing a Chevrolet Corvette C3. In 1975 Hansen made his Trans-Am Series debut at Nelson Ledges. He won the following two Trans-Am races at Road America and Brainerd. Hansen continued in Trans-Am in 1976 and 1977. In 1977 he finished third at Road America after starting 39th. He won another Trans-Am Series in 1978 racing a DeKon Monza at Brainerd. Racing a Corvette, Hansen won two races in the 1982 Trans-Am Series.

Brainerd International Raceway

Jerry Hansen bought Donnybrooke Speedway in 1973 from the original owner George Montgomery. Renaming the track Brainerd International Raceway. Hansen placed a new management team with Mario Andretti as a director for several years. The track had closed down after 1972 but Hansen re-opened the track in 1975 with the Trans-Am Series returning. In 1977 a drag strip was added with the NHRA visiting the track regularly. Under Hansen's reign, the AMA Superbike Championship was introduced to the track in 1982. The Superbike World Championship also visited the track, in 1989, 1990 and 1991. Hansen sold the track in 2006 to Jed and Kristi Copham.

Motorsport results

SCCA National Championship Runoffs

American Open-Wheel racing results
(key) (Races in bold indicate pole position, races in italics indicate fastest race lap)

SCCA Grand Prix Championship

USAC Championship Car

Atlantic Championship

References

1936 births
Living people
Racing drivers from Minnesota
Champ Car drivers
Atlantic Championship drivers
SCCA National Championship Runoffs winners
24 Hours of Daytona drivers
IMSA GT Championship drivers
Trans-Am Series drivers
Can Am drivers
Auto racing executives
Racing drivers from Minneapolis
Sportspeople from Minneapolis